"American Jesus" is the first single by Bad Religion from their 1993 album Recipe for Hate. It was their second all-time single since their signing to Atlantic Records. Eddie Vedder of Pearl Jam provides backing vocals on the track.

Explanation
"American Jesus" takes on the idea that God favors America, rather than other countries. Greg Graffin said "During the Gulf War, George Bush said, 'We'll win, because God is on our side!'. What an amazing statement!" The song touches on antisemitism, war, and religion as an excuse.

Music video
The video is entirely in sepia tone. It shows the band driving around in a car through Los Angeles, with various pedestrians carrying crosses around the city with blindfolds on. The video cuts to clips of the band performing in the desert as well as Graffin walking through the city. It ends with the civilians chanting "one nation, under God" while standing in a row.

Track listing
Atlantic CD Promo 
"American Jesus" (radio remix version)

Sympathy For The Record Industry 7" Single
"American Jesus"
"Stealth"

Semaphore Records CD Promo
"American Jesus"
"Skyscraper"

See also
 List of anti-war songs

References

External links

1993 singles
Bad Religion songs
1993 songs
Epitaph Records singles
Sympathy for the Record Industry singles
Atlantic Records singles
Songs written by Brett Gurewitz
Songs written by Greg Graffin
Songs about Jesus
Songs critical of religion
Protest songs